Raoul Pablo Rodriguez (born February 1, 1963) is an American rower. He won a silver medal at the 1988 Olympic Games in the men's coxless fours, along with Thomas Bohrer, Richard Kennelly, and David Krmpotich.

Born in Ann Arbor, Michigan, he now lives in New York State.

References 

 
 

Living people
1963 births
American male rowers
Rowers at the 1988 Summer Olympics
World Rowing Championships medalists for the United States
Medalists at the 1988 Summer Olympics
Olympic silver medalists for the United States in rowing
Pan American Games medalists in rowing
Pan American Games silver medalists for the United States
Rowers at the 1991 Pan American Games
Sportspeople from Ann Arbor, Michigan